The Maymecha, also known as Medvezhye, is a river in Taymyrsky Dolgano-Nenetsky District of Krasnoyarsk Krai in Russia, right tributary of the Kheta (Khatanga basin).

References

Rivers of Krasnoyarsk Krai